Kad Bi Znala Moja Zena is a 2003 album by the Bosnian root music group Sateliti. From this album on, the membership of the group members never changed, except that the group invited a female vocalist on this and future albums.

Track listing
Djed Unuku Udaje (Grandfather Gives Away Granddaughter at Wedding)
Ode Moja Kona Na Pijacu (My Girl Went to the Market)
Haber Majci (News to Mother)
Ljuljaj Neljuljaj (Shake, Don't Shake)
Ja Ti Doci Necu (I Won't Come to You)
Kad Bi Znala Moja Zena (If Only My Wife Knew)
Majstor Beca (Expert Beca)
Budi Dobar Vojnik (Be A Good Soldier)
Gledaj Kako Ona Igra (Look How She Dances)
Ja Sam Majstor Za Kapije (I'm a Gates Expert)
Vala Cu Joj Kosti Polonmiti (I Will Break Her Bones)
Pjesma U Kolu Satelita (Song in the Sateliti Kolo)

2003 albums
Sateliti albums